Paul Walsh (born 1997) is an Irish Gaelic footballer who plays for Premier Intermediate Championship club Kanturk and at inter-county level with the Cork senior football team. He usually lines out in mid field.

Honours

Kanturk
 Cork Senior A Hurling Championship (1): 2021
 All-Ireland Intermediate Club Hurling Championship (1): 2018
 Munster Intermediate Club Hurling Championship (1): 2017
 Cork Premier Intermediate Hurling Championship (1): 2017
 Cork Intermediate Football Championship (1) 2017

Cork
National Football League Division 3 (1): 2020

References

External link

Paul Walsh profile at the Cork GAA website

1998 births
Living people
Kanturk hurlers
Kanturk Gaelic footballers
Cork inter-county Gaelic footballers
People from Kanturk